Firdaus Zaripovich Kabirov (born 19 May 1961) is a retired Russian rally racer who won two times the Dakar Rally in the trucks category competing for Kamaz.

In 2016, he was named Kamaz's Deputy Director for Development. In December 2021, he was appointed as chief executive officer of United Automotive Technologies, a holding of auto parts manufacturers controlled by Kamaz.

Dakar Rally results

References

External links
 Driver profile at Motorsport.com

1961 births
Living people
Sportspeople from Tatarstan
Recipients of the Order "For Merit to the Fatherland", 4th class
Recipients of the Order of Courage
Recipients of the Order of Honour (Russia)
Recipients of the Order of the Red Banner of Labour
State Prize of the Russian Federation laureates
Dakar Rally drivers
Dakar Rally winning drivers
Off-road racing drivers
Rally raid truck drivers
Russian rally drivers